The Nanjing International Exhibition Center is located in the Xuanwu District of Nanjing, China.

Each year the National Travel Expo is held at the center by the China National Tourism Administration. It will be used as a venue for equestrian competitions for the 2014 Summer Youth Olympics in Nanjing.

Transportation
The center is accessible within walking distance south east of Nanjing Railway Station.
The center is also accessible by taking Line 3, Nanjing Metro and dropping of at Nanjing Forestry University-Xinzhuang Station

See also
 List of convention and exhibition centers in China

References

Buildings and structures in Nanjing
Convention and exhibition centers in China